Octavian Dorin Ormenişan (born 31 August 1992, Târgu Mureș) is a Romanian professional footballer who played as a goalkeeper. He appeared in Liga I for Sportul Studențesc București and FC Vaslui.

Statistics

Statistics accurate as of match played 6 May 2016

External links
 
 
 

1992 births
Living people
Romanian footballers
Association football goalkeepers
ASA 2013 Târgu Mureș players
FC Sportul Studențesc București players
FC Vaslui players
AFC Săgeata Năvodari players
CS Minaur Baia Mare (football) players
Liga I players
Sportspeople from Târgu Mureș